C. A. Subodh Kumar Agrawal is an Indian chartered accountant. He was the president of Institute of Chartered Accountants of India for the year 2013-14.

He is also the president of south Asian Federation of Accountants (SAFA) since January 2014.

References

External links
http://www.icai.org/new_post.html?post_id=188&c_id=199
https://web.archive.org/web/20130216093510/http://www.aubsp.com/2013/02/new-president-of-the-institute-of-chartered-accountants-of-india-icai.html
http://www.icai.org/new_post.html?post_id=188&c_id=199

Indian accountants
Living people
Year of birth missing (living people)